Lindeman's is an Australian winery, owned by Treasury Wine Estates. It was founded in 1843 by Henry Lindeman who planted its first vines in the Hunter Valley region of New South Wales. This original vineyard no longer exists, and the winery now has vineyards in South Australia (Barossa Valley and Coonawarra), in Padthaway  and at Karadoc in Victoria, near Red Cliffs. It is considered a mass-producer of reasonably priced, good quality wine.

In 1993, its Bin 65 chardonnay was Australia's top-selling white-wine export. Five consecutive vintages have been named "best buys" by The Wine Spectator, a consumer magazine, and Robert M. Parker, Jr. has called it "one of the three or four finest chardonnay values in the world" in his newsletter The Wine Advocate.

In the mid 1950s it produced wines of excellence that are still sought by wine collectors and wine enthusiasts today.

In the 1970s, Lindeman's cask wine was marketed to bohemians with a slogan of 'You make me smile, Dr Lindeman', coined by writer Peter Carey.

See also
Philip Shaw, former winemaker at Lindeman's

References

Australian wine
Australian brands
Foster's Group
Hunter Region
Wineries of Australia
Treasury Wine Estates
Australian companies established in 1843
Food and drink companies established in 1843